The 709th Military Police Battalion is a United States Army Military Police unit currently located on Rose Barracks in Vilseck, Germany. The Battalion is the United States Army's only Military Police Battalion in theater. The unit falls under the command of the 18th Military Police Brigade, associated with 21st Theater Sustainment Command.

The 709th Military Police Battalion relocated from Hanau to Grafenwoehr in 2007. The Battalion Headquarters again relocated in the fall of 2018 from Tower to Rose Barracks.

The 709th Military Police Battalion has served with honor and distinction in the European Theater since the summer of 1944. Stationed in Grafenwoehr Germany as part of the "Ever Vigilant" 18th Military Police Brigade, the battalion provides community law enforcement and force protection within thirteen communities while training for future operations and contingencies in support of the 21st Theater Sustainment Command. In addition to providing Law Enforcement across Europe, the Battalion also supports Operation Atlantic Resolve, to include Saber Guardian 2017, Saber Strike 2018 and many other exercises throughout the theater.

Lineage and honors 
Began on 10 January 1942 in the Army of the United States as the 709th Military Police Battalion. 
Activated 9 April 1942 at Camp Niantic, Connecticut. 
Reorganized and redesignated 5 June 1945 as the 709th Military Police Service Battalion
Reorganized and redesignated 18 September 1951 as the 709th Military Police Battalion and allotted to the Regular Army
Companies A, B, and C inactivated 21 October 1977 in Germany

HHD 709th Military Police Battalion Campaign participation 
 World War II:
Northern France
Peace Keeping:
Operation Provide Comfort
Operation Provide Promise Kosovo & Bosnia
 GWOT:
Iraq - First Military Police Battalion to cross into Iraq
Afghanistan
 HHD 709th MP Bn Unit Decorations
Valorous Unit Award for IRAQ 2003–2004
Army Superior Unit Award for 1995–1996

Subordinate units
HHD 709th Military Police Battalion - Vilseck; Commander:  CPT Dominic Gatling, Detachment Sergeant:  SFC Craig Williams

92nd Military Police Company - Kaiserslautern & Baumholder; Commander:  CPT Addison Flynn, First Sergeant:  1SG Paul Counterman-Grenauer

527th Military Police Company - Hohenfels & Ansbach; Commander: CPT Kyle Thorpe, First Sergeant:  1SG Salvador Montenegro

529th Military Police Company - Wiesbaden, Vicenza & Camp Darby; Commander:  CPT Paige Lehman, First Sergeant:  1SG Daniel Gotschall

554th Military Police Company - Stuttgart; Commander:  CPT Natalie Budner, First Sergeant:  1SG Nathaniel Gonzales

615th Military Police Company - Vilseck; Commander:  CPT Zachary Stilwell, First Sergeant:  1SG Chelledon Chenault

Command group
 Lieutenant Colonel M. Elizabeth McGovney, Battalion Commander.
 Command Sergeant Major Hermes F. Acevedo, Battalion Command Sergeant Major.
 Major Justin Collins, Executive Officer.
 Major Hannah Verner, S3.
 Sergeant Major Gregory Elderkin, S3 Sergeant Major.

Unit decorations

References

External links

Globalsecurity.org, 709th Military Police Battalion

709